Don H. Liu is a Korean-American lawyer and Chief Legal and Risk Officer of Target Corporation.

Early life and education
Don H. Liu was born in Seoul, South Korea on 1963. His father was a mid-level city bureaucrat, and his mother was a nurse. Liu is the eldest of three children. The family moved to the U.S. on 1973 when he was 10 years old, after his mother got a job in a hospital in Philadelphia. The first family member to learn English, Liu learned how to operate a business by helping his father on the series of businesses that he built up.

Liu earned his Bachelor of Arts in Philosophy and religion degree from Haverford College, and was awarded his Juris Doctor degree as a Harlan Fiske Stone Scholar from Columbia University School of Law.

Career 
Beginning in 1987, Liu served as an associate in New York City for Simpson, Thacher and Bartlett, and then  for Richards & O’Neil. His career working for law firms ended in 1992. Subsequently, he became  Deputy Chief Legal Officer and Vice President of Aetna U.S. Healthcare. After that, he was Senior Vice President, Secretary and General Counsel for IKON Office Solutions and then as  Senior Vice President, Chief Compliance Manager and General Counsel at Toll Brothers, Inc.  He was subsequently Executive VP, General Counsel and Secretary for the Xerox Corporation.

Since August 22, 2016, Liu has been  executive vice president, corporate secretary, and chief legal officer of the Target Corporation.

Awards and honors 
In 2017, Liu was featured in the National Law Journal as a Target corporation board member. He received the  "Roderick Palmore Pathmaker Award" in 2014 for his  achievements in law and the America's Top General Counsel Honor from NYSE Euronext's Corporate Board Member". Liu has also received the 2005 Justice in Action award from the Asian American Legal Defense and Education Fund, the 2004 “Business Leadership Award” from the Korean American Coalition" and the 2004 "Asian Pacific American Lawyers Association" of New Jersey Annual Achievement Award. A scholar's program, The Don H. Liu Scholars Program, Inc. was a scholarship created by Asian American Bar Association of New York for law students in the United States.

References 

1963 births
Living people
People from Seoul
Haverford College alumni
Lawyers from New York City
Target Corporation people